Eulamprotes ochricapilla is a moth of the family Gelechiidae. It was described by Rebel in 1903. It is found in France, Italy, the Czech Republic, Slovakia and Romania.

The forewings are deep black with whitish-yellow markings. The hindwings are dark grey.

References

Moths described in 1903
Eulamprotes